"Barrett's Privateers" is a modern folk song in the style of a sea shanty, written and performed by Canadian musician Stan Rogers, having been inspired after a song session with the Friends of Fiddler's Green at the Northern Lights Festival Boréal in Sudbury, Ontario. Although Barrett, the Antelope and other specific instances mentioned in the song are fictional, "Barrett's Privateers" is full of many authentic details of privateering in the late 18th century.

The song was released on the album Fogarty's Cove in 1976 and has since gained popularity as a drinking song, with cover versions by many bands. It also appears on later Stan Rogers live albums Home in Halifax and Between the Breaks ... Live! It is regarded as one of the Royal Canadian Navy's unofficial anthems, the unofficial anthem of Atlantic Canada and also often heard sung at many Atlantic universities including (west to east) Acadia University, University of New Brunswick, Mount Allison University, Dalhousie University, Saint Mary's University, University of King's College, St. Francis Xavier University, Cape Breton University, and Memorial University of Newfoundland.

Plot 
"Barrett's Privateers" is sung from the point of view of a young fisherman who, in 1778 at the age of 16, enlisted on “El Cid” Barrett's ill-fated Antelope, with the promise that the resulting trip would be a pleasure cruise with no violence.  The Antelope is described as the "scummiest vessel [he'd] ever seen", and the song describes the many faults of the decrepit sloop, which had just received a letter of marque from George III to operate as a privateering ship.

The sloop leaves on June 4 (the king's birthday) and takes three months to make it to Montego Bay, Jamaica. After a five-day layover, the Antelope returns to sea and encounters an American merchant ship loaded down with gold. Because of the poor state of the sloop, it takes the Antelope two days to come within firing distance of the American vessel, which ultimately turns out to be far more heavily armed than they are.  The Antelope is capsized with one volley from the American vessel, and the narrator witnesses Barrett's gruesome death, when he is crushed like a bowl of eggs. The singer, who loses use of both his legs after they are struck by the truck of the mainmast, survives.

The closing verse moves ahead to 1784, as the survivor has only the day prior returned to Nova Scotia, still bitter at having been lied to and lying broken on a pier in Halifax, longing to return to his (notably anachronistic) home of Sherbrooke.

Cover versions 

The popularity of "Barrett's Privateers" has inspired cover versions by many bands, such as the pirate metal band Alestorm on their third album, Back Through Time. This cover also features a guitar solo by Heri Joensen from Týr.

The Australian band Weddings Parties Anything and the folk group Schooner Fare also covered this song.

Phil 'Swill' Odgers singer with UK band The Men They Couldn't Hang does a rousing solo version after learning the words and melody from Weddings Parties Anything backstage over a few beers at Mariposa Folk Festival 1989. It's become a firm live favourite ever since.

Covered by Canadian folk band The Irish Descendants on their 1994 album Gypsies & Lovers.

Covered by Fisherman's Friends on their 2002 album Home From the Sea.

Covered by the Corries and released on their 2006 album Barrett's Privateers. In this version, the line "I wish I was in Sherbrooke now" is replaced with "I wish I was in Edinburgh now".

Covered by Blackbeard's Tea Party on their 2011 album Tomorrow We'll Be Sober.

In 2012 the Kingston Trio recorded an a cappella version on Born at the Right Time and Celtic punk band the Real McKenzies covered it on Westwinds.

As part of a comedy bit on The Late Show with Stephen Colbert in July, 2022, both the host and Jack White sang the first verse together, neither of them knowing that the other knew the song. Stephen Colbert had sung the song before in March, 2022 with Michael Bublé.

Notes

References

External links 
 Lyrics on Stan Rogers's website
 US Navy plays Barrett's Privateers while leaving Halifax, on YouTube

Stan Rogers songs
Songs about fishers
Songs about pirates
Sea shanties
Privateering in the American Revolutionary War
Drinking songs
1976 songs
Songs written by Stan Rogers
Canadian patriotic songs
Songs based on Canadian history